Ummannoor  is a village and gram panchayat in Kollam district in the state of Kerala, India. It comes under Kottarakkara assembly, Mavelikkara parliamentary constituency and Vettikkavala block panchayat. The place have a good functional Village office too. Ummannoor village has population of 17406 as per the Census India 2011. Ummannoor is known for farming and agricultural trade like Ginger, Black pepper, Paddy, Rubber etc.

St.John's Higher secondary is one of the oldest school in the area.

A good Primary Health centre is functioning near Ummannoor village office.

Demographics
 India census, Ummannoor had a population of 17,406, with 8436 males and 8970 females.

Schools
MM LPS Andoor
Marthoma High School
St. John's vhss Ummannoor
Rama Vilasam H S S
Govt LPS Ummannoor

References

2, data source; https://village.kerala.gov.in/Office_websites/indexor.php?nm=304304Ummannurvillageoffice

3, https://geoiq.io/places/Ummannoor/YQPWIaKqQ4

Villages in Kollam district